The Hengduan Mountains are a group of mountain ranges in southwest China that connect the southeast portions of the Tibetan Plateau with the Yunnan–Guizhou Plateau.  The Hengduan Mountains are primarily large north-south mountain ranges that effectively separate lowlands in northern Myanmar from the lowlands of the Sichuan Basin.  These ranges are characterized by significant vertical relief originating from the Indian subcontinent's collision with the Eurasian Plate, and further carved out by the major rivers draining the eastern Tibetan Plateau. These rivers, the Yangtze, Mekong, and Salween, are recognized today as the Three Parallel Rivers UNESCO World Heritage Site.

The Hengduan Mountains cover much of western present-day Sichuan province as well as the northwestern portions of Yunnan, the easternmost section of the Tibet Autonomous Region, and touching upon parts of southern Qinghai. Additionally, some parts of eastern Kachin State in neighbouring Myanmar are considered part of the Hengduan group.

The Hengduan Mountains subalpine conifer forests is a palaearctic ecoregion in the Temperate coniferous forests biome that covers portions of the mountains.

Geography

The Hengduan Mountain system consists of many component mountain ranges, most of which run roughly north to south.  These mountain ranges, in turn, can be further divided into various subranges. The component ranges of the Hengduan are separated by deep river valleys that channel the waters of many of Southeast Asia's great rivers. The core of the Hengduan Mountains can be divided into four major component ranges, described below.

 The westernmost primary range of the Hengduan runs north-south between the Salween (Nu) and Mekong (Lancang) Rivers. The northern half of this range, found in the Tibet Autonomous Region, is called the Taniantaweng Mountains while the southern half, in Yunnan, is called the Nu Mountains. A major subrange along this system is the Meili Snow Mountains and their highest peak, Kawagebo.
Moving eastward, the next major subsection of the Hengduan Mountains is the range running between the Mekong (Lancang) and Yangtze (Jinsha) Rivers. The northernmost parts of this range are called the Mangkam Mountains, the middle section is known as the Ninchin Mountains, and the southern end is called the Yun Range.  The Yulong Mountains are a subrange of this system and the highest peak here is Jade Dragon Snow Mountain's Shanzidou. Eastern Himalaya, part of larger Himalaya mountains, is Hengduan Mountain's immediate neighbor to its west.
 The third primary component of the Hengduan ranges is the section running between the Yangtze (Jinsha) and Yalong Rivers. This section is known for almost its entire length as the Shaluli Mountains except for the northernmost subrange that is called the Chola Mountains. The highest point of this entire section is the Ge'nyen Massif.
 The easternmost of the Hengduan core ranges is the Daxue Mountains between the Yalong River and Dadu River. This range is dominated by Mount Gongga, the highest peak in the entire Hengduan group as well as the highest peak east of the Himalayas.
 In addition to the four core systems, described above, some adjacent ranges are also sometimes included as part of the Hengduan group. To the west, the Gaoligong Mountains form an additional barrier along the Salween's western edge, but are more accurately described as an extension of the Baxoila Range connecting with the eastern Nyenchen Tanglha Mountains across central Tibet.  To the east, the Qionglai Mountains and the Min Mountains are sometimes included as part of the Hengduan Mountains as these two ranges form the eastern edges of the Tibetan Plateau.

Ecosystems
The Hengduan Mountains support a range of habitats, from subtropical to temperate to montane biomes. The mountains are largely covered by subalpine coniferous forests. The dense, pristine forests, the relative isolation, and the fact that most of the area remained free from glaciation during the ice ages provides a very complex habitat with a high degree of biological diversity.

The ecoregions that coincide with the Hengduan Mountains are:
The Southeast Tibet shrub and meadows in the higher elevation and norther parts of the Hengduan
The Hengduan Mountains subalpine conifer forests in northern Yunnan and western Sichuan parts of the central Hengduan
The Nujiang Langcang Gorge alpine conifer and mixed forests along the westernmost ranges of the Hengduan
The Qionglai-Minshan conifer forests in the east parts of the Hengduan along the edge of the Sichuan Basin
The Yunnan Plateau subtropical evergreen forests at the southern parts of the Hengduan where the mountains transition to the Yungui Plateau
The Northern Indochina subtropical forests in the Nu Mountains, a southwestern component range of the Hengduan in Yunnan

Additionally, the lowest elevation portions of the Jinsha (Yangtze) River and Nu (Salween) River valleys in the southern Hengduan ranges are classified by the Chinese government as a tropical savanna environment, but this has not been recognized by the WWF.

The easternmost ranges of the Hengduan are home to the rare and endangered giant panda.  Other species native to the mountains are the Chinese yew (Taxus chinensis) and various other rare plants, deer, and primates.

Gallery

See also
Global 200
The Hump

References

External links
Biodiversity of the Hengduan Mountains and adjacent areas of south-central China - a research project at Harvard University
PBS NOVA's First Flower discusses botanical diversity in the Hengduan Shan
The 26 mountains of Yunnan

Transhimalayas
Mountain ranges of Myanmar
Mountain ranges of Tibet
Mountain ranges of Sichuan
Mountain ranges of Yunnan